José Norberto Huezo Montoya (born 6 June 1956) is a retired football player from El Salvador who represented his country at the 1982 FIFA World Cup in Spain.

Club career
Huezo started his career at UES and played for ANTEL before joining Atlético Marte in 1976. He then played in Mexico, but returned to Marte only to try his luck abroad again when he moved to Spanish side Palencia. He also played for Cartagena FC but returned to Marte again in 1985. 
He left after a year for Costa Rican outfit Herediano with whom he won a league title and then for Guatemalan side Jalapa. He finished his career at FAS.

International career
Nicknamed Pajarito (little bird), Huezo participated in the 1975 Pan American Games hosted in Mexico. El Salvador competed in a group with Brazil, Nicaragua and Costa Rica. They debuted with a 4–1 score against Nicaragua on Oct. 14 with 3 goals from Huezo. El Salvador eventually finished third in Group D.

Huezo represented his country in 22 FIFA World Cup qualification matches and played in all three games at the 1982 World Cup Finals.

Huezo scored 16 goals for the El Salvador national football team from 1973 to 1987.

References

External links
La Prensa Profile

1956 births
Living people
Sportspeople from San Salvador
Association football midfielders
Salvadoran footballers
El Salvador international footballers
Pan American Games competitors for El Salvador
Footballers at the 1975 Pan American Games
1982 FIFA World Cup players
C.D. Atlético Marte footballers
C.F. Monterrey players
Cartagena FC players
C.S. Herediano footballers
Deportivo Jalapa players
C.D. FAS footballers
Segunda División players
Liga MX players
Liga FPD players
Expatriate footballers in Mexico
Expatriate footballers in Spain
Expatriate footballers in Costa Rica
Expatriate footballers in Guatemala
Salvadoran expatriate footballers
Salvadoran expatriate sportspeople in Costa Rica
Salvadoran expatriate sportspeople in Guatemala
Salvadoran expatriate sportspeople in Mexico
Salvadoran expatriate sportspeople in Spain
Palencia CF players